William Sprague may refer to:
 William Sprague (1609–1675), original American settler
 William Buell Sprague (1795–1876), American clergyman and compiler of Annals of the American Pulpit
 William Sprague III (1799–1856), American politician from Rhode Island, uncle of William Sprague IV
 William Sprague (Michigan politician) (1809–1868), politician from Michigan
 William P. Sprague (1827–1899), politician from Ohio
 William Sprague IV (1830–1915), politician from Rhode Island, nephew of William Sprague III
 William George Robert Sprague (1863–1933), London theatre designer

See also
Sprague (surname)